The communauté d'agglomération du Pays Basque, is the agglomeration community, an intercommunal structure, centred on the cities of Bayonne and Biarritz. It is located in the Pyrénées-Atlantiques department, in the Nouvelle-Aquitaine region, southwestern France. It was created in January 2017 by the merger of the former communauté de l'agglomération Côte Basque-Adour, communauté de l'agglomération Sud Pays Basque and eight communautés de communes. Its area is 2968 km2. Its population was 312,278 in 2018, including 51,411 in Bayonne and 25,532 in Biarritz.

Composition
The Communauté d'agglomération du Pays Basque consists of the following 158 communes:

Ahaxe-Alciette-Bascassan
Ahetze
Aïcirits-Camou-Suhast
Aincille
Ainharp
Ainhice-Mongelos
Ainhoa
Alçay-Alçabéhéty-Sunharette
Aldudes
Alos-Sibas-Abense
Amendeuix-Oneix
Amorots-Succos
Anglet
Anhaux
Arancou
Arbérats-Sillègue
Arbonne
Arbouet-Sussaute
Arcangues
Arhansus
Armendarits
Arnéguy
Aroue-Ithorots-Olhaïby
Arrast-Larrebieu
Arraute-Charritte
Ascain
Ascarat
Aussurucq
Ayherre
Banca
Barcus
Bardos
Bassussarry
Bayonne
Béguios
Béhasque-Lapiste
Béhorléguy
Bergouey-Viellenave
Berrogain-Laruns
Beyrie-sur-Joyeuse
Biarritz
Bidache
Bidarray
Bidart
Biriatou
Bonloc
Boucau
Briscous
Bunus
Bussunarits-Sarrasquette
Bustince-Iriberry
Cambo-les-Bains
Came
Camou-Cihigue
Çaro
Charritte-de-Bas
Chéraute
Ciboure
Domezain-Berraute
Espelette
Espès-Undurein
Estérençuby
Etcharry
Etchebar
Gabat
Gamarthe
Garindein
Garris
Gotein-Libarrenx
Guéthary
Guiche
Halsou
Hasparren
Haux
Hélette
Hendaye
Hosta
Ibarrolle
Idaux-Mendy
Iholdy
Ilharre
Irissarry
Irouléguy
Ispoure
Isturits
Itxassou
Jatxou
Jaxu
Juxue
La Bastide-Clairence
Labets-Biscay
Lacarre
Lacarry-Arhan-Charritte-de-Haut
Laguinge-Restoue
Lahonce
Lantabat
Larceveau-Arros-Cibits
Larrau
Larressore
Larribar-Sorhapuru
Lasse
Lecumberry
L'Hôpital-Saint-Blaise
Lichans-Sunhar
Lichos
Licq-Athérey
Lohitzun-Oyhercq
Louhossoa
Luxe-Sumberraute
Macaye
Masparraute
Mauléon-Licharre
Méharin
Mendionde
Menditte
Mendive
Moncayolle-Larrory-Mendibieu
Montory
Mouguerre
Musculdy
Ordiarp
Orègue
Orsanco
Ossas-Suhare
Osserain-Rivareyte
Ossès
Ostabat-Asme
Pagolle
Roquiague
Sainte-Engrâce
Saint-Esteben
Saint-Étienne-de-Baïgorry
Saint-Jean-de-Luz
Saint-Jean-le-Vieux
Saint-Jean-Pied-de-Port
Saint-Just-Ibarre
Saint-Martin-d'Arberoue
Saint-Martin-d'Arrossa
Saint-Michel
Saint-Palais
Saint-Pée-sur-Nivelle
Saint-Pierre-d'Irube
Sames
Sare
Sauguis-Saint-Étienne
Souraïde
Suhescun
Tardets-Sorholus
Trois-Villes
Uhart-Cize
Uhart-Mixe
Urcuit
Urepel
Urrugne
Urt
Ustaritz
Villefranque
Viodos-Abense-de-Bas

See also 
Government of Navarre
Basque Government

References

Basque
Northern Basque Country
Basque